Henry Masquilier Thiriez (16 August 1870 – 16 April 1954) was a French composer. His work was part of the music event in the art competition at the 1924 Summer Olympics.

References

1870 births
1954 deaths
19th-century French composers
20th-century French composers
Olympic competitors in art competitions
People from Tourcoing